Higareda is a surname. Notable people with the surname include:

Eduardo Higareda (born 1937), Mexican equestrian
Martha Higareda (born 1983), Mexican actress, film producer, and writer
Miriam Higareda (born 1984), Mexican actress, sister of Martha